Sir Robert Walter Carden, 1st Baronet (7 October 1801 – 19 January 1888) was a British banker and Conservative politician.

Carden was the son of James Carden and his wife Mary (née Walter), who was a daughter of John Walter, founder of The Times newspaper.  In 1816, he took a commission in the 52nd (Oxfordshire) Regiment of Foot.

Later a successful banker, he was knighted in 1851. He served as Sheriff of London in 1850 and was elected Lord Mayor of London in 1857. He was elected to the House of Commons as one of two representatives for Gloucester in 1857, a seat he held until 1859. Carden was out of Parliament for more than twenty years, but returned in 1880 when he was elected Member of Parliament for Barnstaple, which he remained until 1885. Apart from his business and political career he also served as a Justice of the Peace for Surrey and Middlesex. In June 1887, aged 85, he was created a baronet, of Molesey in the County of Surrey.

Carden married Pamela Elizabeth Edith, daughter of William Smith Andrews, in 1827. They had three sons and seven daughters. She died in 1874. Carden survived her by fourteen years and died in January 1888, aged 86. He was succeeded in the baronetcy by his eldest son Frederick. Sir Robert Walter Carden is buried alongside his wife and two of his children at Kensal Green Cemetery.

References

www.thepeerage.com

External links 
 

1801 births
1888 deaths
Baronets in the Baronetage of the United Kingdom
Conservative Party (UK) MPs for English constituencies
UK MPs 1857–1859
UK MPs 1880–1885
Sheriffs of the City of London
19th-century lord mayors of London
Members of the Parliament of the United Kingdom for Barnstaple
19th-century English politicians
52nd Regiment of Foot officers
Members of Parliament for Gloucester